Clare Margaret Holman (born 12 January 1964) is an English actress. She portrayed forensic pathologist Dr. Laura Hobson in the crime drama series Inspector Morse and its spin-off Lewis from 1995 to 2015.

Career

Holman started her acting career in the 1988 television film The Rainbow based on the novel by D.H. Lawrence, directed by Stuart Burge.

In 1989 she played the part of the school teacher Mary Llewellyn in an adaptation of The Fifteen Streets by Catherine Cookson.

In 1991, she played Iris Bentley, sister to Derek Bentley, played by Christopher Eccleston, in the film Let Him Have It, and in 1992, she voiced Juliet in the Shakespeare: The Animated Tales adaptation of Romeo and Juliet.

She played Harper in the Royal National Theatre's production of Tony Kushner's Angels in America in November 1993. In 1995, Holman was cast as Dr Laura Hobson in the crime drama series Inspector Morse, where she continued to play that part until 2000 when the series ended.

Holman was nominated for a 1997 Laurence Olivier Theatre Award for Best Actress in a Supporting Role in 1996 for her performance in Who's Afraid of Virginia Woolf?. She appeared in three episodes of Midsomer Murders as three different characters. The episodes are entitled Country Matters (2005), Ring Out Your Dead (2002), and The Miniature Murders (2019).

In 2006, Holman reprised her role of Dr Hobson in the series Lewis, which series ended in 2015. She appeared in all 33 episodes.

In 2007, Holman played Wendy the narrator and mother of Michael in the television series Fallen Angel, a story about Rosie Byfield, a clergyman's daughter who grows up to be a psychopathic killer, starring Emilia Fox.

In October 2013 she played the role of Liz in the Tricycle Theatre production of the Moira Buffini play Handbagged, and in 2015, Holman appeared in the film Suite Francaise. From April to May 2015, she appeared as Myra Bolton in Doris Lessing's play, Each His Own Wilderness, at the Orange Tree Theatre in Richmond, London.

Holman has directed six episodes of Doctors in 2010 and two episodes of Holby City in 2012.

Personal life
Holman was married to director Howard Davies. They married in April 2005 in Stratton, Cornwall, and were together until his death in October 2016. She has stepchildren and stepgrandchildren from her husband's previous marriage. She supports ending violence against girls, contributing to Plan UK, part of the world's biggest campaign for girls' rights.

Filmography

References

External links
 

1964 births
English television actresses
Living people
Academics of the Guildhall School of Music and Drama
Actresses from London
English stage actresses
20th-century English actresses
21st-century English actresses
People from the City of London